In algebraic geometry, a Cartan subgroup of a connected linear algebraic group over an algebraically closed field is the centralizer of a maximal torus (which turns out to be connected). Cartan subgroups are nilpotent and are all conjugate.

Examples 
 For a finite field F, the group of diagonal matrices  where a and b are elements of F*. This is called the split Cartan subgroup of GL2(F).
 For a finite field F, every maximal commutative semisimple subgroup of GL2(F) is a Cartan subgroup (and conversely).

See also 
Borel subgroup

References 

 
 
 
 

Algebraic geometry
Linear algebraic groups